Mammillaria uncinata is a species of cactus in the family Cactaceae. It is endemic to Mexico.

References

uncinata
Taxa named by Joseph Gerhard Zuccarini
Cacti of Mexico